Elections to South Ribble Borough Council were held on 1 May 2003.  The whole council was up for election with boundary changes since the last election in 1999 increasing the number of seats by one.  The council stayed under no overall control.  Overall turnout was 31%.

Election result

|}

Ward results

References
Election results
Ward results

2003 English local elections
2003
2000s in Lancashire